The Copalis River is a stream on the Olympic Peninsula in the U.S. state of Washington. It originates in the foothills on the southwest side of the Olympic Mountains and empties into the Pacific Ocean. The name "Copalis" comes from the Quinault language term /k'ʷpíls/. The Copalises are a Native American group. Both the Chehalis people and Quinault Indian Nation claim the Copalis are a subdivision of their tribe.

Course
The Copalis River originates in the southwestern portion of the Olympic Peninsula a few miles south of the Quinault Reservation and just north of the Humptulips River. At its mouth, the river is bordered by the Copalis spit, a small peninsula that serves as refuge for migratory birds.

See also
 List of rivers of Washington

References

Rivers of Washington (state)
Rivers of Grays Harbor County, Washington